Alvaiázere is a municipality in the district of Leiria in Portugal. The population in 2011 was 7,287, in an area of 160.48 km2.

The municipality is bordered by the municipalities of Ansião (to the north), Figueiró dos Vinhos (to the northeast and east), Ferreira do Zêzere (to the southeast), Ourém (to the southwest) and Pombal (to the west). The present Mayor is Paulo Delgado Morgado, elected by the Social Democratic Party. The municipal holiday is on June 13.

Origin of the name Alvaiázere: from the Arabic word "Al-Baiaz" (the falconer); lands of the falconer. Manuel Vieira da Silva Borges e Abreu, 1st Baron of Alvaiázere was the main physician of King John VI of Portugal.

Parishes
Administratively, the municipality is divided into 5 civil parishes (freguesias):
 Almoster
 Alvaiázere
 Maçãs de Dona Maria
 Pelmá
 Pussos São Pedro

Climate

References

External links
 Municipality official website

Towns in Portugal
Populated places in Leiria District
Municipalities of Leiria District